South Kirkby and Moorthorpe is a civil parish in the City of Wakefield in West Yorkshire, England which is governed locally by South Kirkby and Moorthorpe Town Council. The parish and town council are made up of the town of South Kirkby and the village of Moorthorpe.  As of 2009 the parish had a population of 10,979, increasing to 11,105 at the 2011 Census.

See also
Listed buildings in South Kirkby and Moorthorpe

References

Geography of the City of Wakefield
Civil parishes in West Yorkshire